The 2020 Wake Forest Demon Deacons women's soccer team represented Wake Forest University during the 2020 NCAA Division I women's soccer season.  The Demon Deacons were led by head coach Tony Da Luz, in his eighteenth season.  They played home games at Spry Stadium.  This is the team's 26th season playing organized women's college soccer, all of which have been played in the Atlantic Coast Conference.

Due to the COVID-19 pandemic, the ACC played a reduced schedule in 2020 and the NCAA Tournament was postponed to 2021.  The ACC did not play a spring league schedule, but did allow teams to play non-conference games that would count toward their 2020 record in the lead up to the NCAA Tournament.

The Demon Deacons finished the fall season 3–5–1, 3–4–1 in ACC play to finish in ninth place. They did not qualify for the ACC Tournament.  They finished the spring season 2–2–1 and were not invited to the NCAA Tournament.

Previous season 

The Demon Deacons finished the season 6–8–4 overall, and 1–6–3 in ACC play to finish in twelfth place.  They did not qualify for the ACC Tournament and were not invited to the NCAA Tournament.

Squad

Roster

Updated February 24, 2021

Team management

Source:

Schedule

Source:

|-
!colspan=6 style=""| Fall Regular season

|-
!colspan=6 style=""| Spring Regular season

Rankings

Fall 2020

Spring 2021

References

Wake Forest
Wake Forest Demon Deacons women's soccer seasons
2020 in sports in North Carolina